The tunnel de l'Étoile is a tunnel in Paris. In the past it was a road tunnel, but since 2020 it is a bicycle tunnel. It links the avenue des Champs-Élysées to the avenue de la Grande Armée, passing underneath the place Charles de Gaulle and the Arc de Triomphe. It is around 400 metres long.

History 
While being a road tunnel, it had two one way lanes.

Its entrance has been the site of many road traffic accidents by trucks. Trucks are too high and hit the tunnel roof. No portico can be built on the surface since it would affect the appearance of the Arc de Triomphe and breach the Arc's listing statute. In 2009 an accident occurred there every two weeks.

In March 2015, the tunnel was "temporarily" closed, but it never reopened for motorized traffic.

In May 2020, the tunnel reopened as a bicycle tunnel.

References 
 Paris : spectaculaire accident sous le tunnel de l'Étoile, Le Parisien, 10 September 2009
 Enquête sur un scandale de 2m40 : les accidents de camion du tunnel de l’Etoile, citizenside.com, 24 November 2009
 2m40, blog on accidents at the tunnel entrance

Notes

Road tunnels in France
Buildings and structures in the 17th arrondissement of Paris
Cycling tunnels